Josef Novotný (born 29 March 1956) is a Czech volleyball player. He competed in the men's tournament at the 1980 Summer Olympics.

References

External links
 

1956 births
Living people
Czech men's volleyball players
Olympic volleyball players of Czechoslovakia
Volleyball players at the 1980 Summer Olympics
People from Děčín District
Sportspeople from the Ústí nad Labem Region